The 45th Walker Cup Match was played on 12 and 13 September 2015 at Royal Lytham & St Annes Golf Club in Lytham St Annes, Lancashire, England. Great Britain and Ireland won 16½ to 9½.

Format
On Saturday, there are four matches of foursomes in the morning and eight singles matches in the afternoon. On Sunday, there are again four matches of foursomes in the morning, followed by ten singles matches in the afternoon. In all, 26 matches are played.

Each of the 26 matches is worth one point in the larger team competition. If a match is all square after the 18th hole extra holes are not played. Rather, each side earns ½ a point toward their team total. The team that accumulates at least 13½ points wins the competition. In the event of a tie, the current holder retains the Cup.

Teams
Ten players for the US and Great Britain & Ireland participated in the event plus one non-playing captain for each team.

Note: "Rank" is the World Amateur Golf Ranking as of 26 August 2015.

Sam Horsfield was originally named to the GB&I team but withdrew and was replaced by Ewen Ferguson.

Saturday's matches

Morning foursomes

Afternoon singles

Sunday's matches

Morning foursomes

Afternoon singles

References

External links
R&A official site
USGA official site
Royal Lytham & St Annes Golf Club

Walker Cup
Golf tournaments in England
Walker Cup
Walker Cup
Walker Cup